Zoraida di Granata (also Zoraide di Granata or Zoraïda di Granata) is a melodramma eroico (opera seria or 'heroic' opera), in two acts by Gaetano Donizetti. The Italian libretto had been partly prepared by Bartolomeo Merelli (about whose tardiness the composer complained), based on the French play, Gonzalve de Cordoue ou Grenade Reconquise by Jean-Pierre Claris de Florian (1791), and on a libretto by Luigi Romanelli to an opera by Nicolini called Abenamet e Zoraide.

When Donizetti arrived in Rome, carrying a letter of introduction from his teacher and mentor Johann Simon Mayr to poet and librettist Jacopo Ferretti, he secured his help in revising Merelli's text.

Although it was Donizetti's first theatrical success "and the opera in which he began to adopt 'Rossinian' techniques", the original 1822 version of this violent love story was never given a complete performance because Amerigo Sbigoli, the tenor originally cast in the role of Abenamet, died shortly before the first night, with no replacement available. Donizetti quickly adapted this role for contralto, though omitting three numbers in the process.

The first performance took place at the Teatro Argentina, Rome, on 28 January 1822 and it and its composer received great acclaim in the weekly Notizie del giorno:
"A new and very happy hope is rising for the Italian musical theatre. The young Maestro Gaetano Donizetti...has launched himself strongly in his truly serious opera, Zoraida.  Unanimous, sincere, universal was the applause he justly collected from the capacity audience...".

The opera was presented in a revised edition at the same theatre on 7 January 1824, and given a revival in Lisbon in 1825.

Roles

Synopsis 
Time: 1480
Place: Granada, Spain.

The murderous and duplicitous Almuzir wishes to marry Zoraida, the daughter of the late king, who in turn loves Abenamet, the victorious General of the Moors. To save Abenamet from the sentence of death passed on him consequent to the machinations of Almuzir, Zoraida agrees to the marriage. She survives Abenamet's doubts as to her fidelity and somewhat implausibly is allowed to marry him.

Recordings

1822 version

1824 version
The Opera Rara recording contains an additional twenty pieces from the 1824 version, with Diana Montague in the role of Abenamet (CD 3, tracks 10-14, and CD 4).

.

References
Notes

Cited sources

Ashbrook, William and Sarah Hibberd (2001), in Holden, Amanda (Ed.), The New Penguin Opera Guide, New York: Penguin Putnam. .  pp. 224 – 247.
 Ashbrook, William (1986), Donizetti. I: La vita, Turin: EDT. 
Osborne, Charles, (1994),  The Bel Canto Operas of Rossini, Donizetti, and Bellini, Portland, Oregon: Amadeus Press. 

Other sources
Allitt, John Stewart (1991), Donizetti: in the light of Romanticism and the teaching of Johann Simon Mayr, Shaftesbury: Element Books, Ltd (UK); Rockport, MA: Element, Inc.(USA)
Ashbrook, William (1982), Donizetti and His Operas, Cambridge University Press.  
Ashbrook, William (1998), "Donizetti, Gaetano" in Stanley Sadie (Ed.),  The New Grove Dictionary of Opera, Vol. One. London: Macmillan Publishers, Inc.   
Loewenberg, Alfred (1970). Annals of Opera, 1597-1940, 2nd edition.  Rowman and Littlefield
Sadie, Stanley, (Ed.); John Tyrell (Exec. Ed.) (2004), The New Grove Dictionary of Music and Musicians.  2nd edition. London: Macmillan.    (hardcover).   (eBook).
 Weinstock, Herbert (1963), Donizetti and the World of Opera in Italy, Paris, and Vienna in the First Half of the Nineteenth Century, New York: Pantheon Books.

External links
  Donizetti Society (London) website
 Information and Libretto (Italian) 1
 Recording on Opera Rara website

Italian-language operas
Operas by Gaetano Donizetti
Operas
Operas set in Spain
1822 operas
Operas based on plays